Daniel Kandlbauer (born 1983) is a Swiss pop musician who achieved notoriety on the Swiss reality show MusicStars. Kandlbauer was one of the finalists of the show, and he performed songs on several of their successful singles and albums. Since the show's climax, he has released a single entitled "Maybe In Heaven". The single charted on August 7, 2005 and peaked at number three.

References

Swiss pop musicians
Living people
1983 births
21st-century guitarists